If an Angel Came to See You, Would You Make Her Feel at Home? is the third studio album released by southern rock band Black Oak Arkansas in 1972. It is the recording debut of drummer Tommy Aldridge.

Track listing
All selections written by Black Oak Arkansas.
 "Gravel Roads" – 3:11
 "Fertile Woman" – 5:18
 "Spring Vacation" – 3:01  
 "We Help Each Other" – 3:12
 "Full Moon Ride" – 3:46 
 "Our Minds Eye" – 4:13 
 "To Make Us What We Are" – 4:53
 "Our Eyes Ere on You" – 3:45
 "Mutants of the Monster" – 4:44

Personnel
Black Oak Arkansas
Jim "Dandy" Mangrum - lead vocals, washboard
Rickie "Ricochet" Reynolds - 12-string rhythm guitar, vocals
Pat "Dirty" Daugherty - bass guitar, vocals
Harvey "Burley" Jett - lead guitar, banjo, piano, vocals
Stanley "Goober" Knight - lead and steel guitar, organ, vocals
Tommy "T.A." Aldridge - drums

Production
Doc Siegel - executive producer
Howie Albert and Ron Albert, Chuck Kirkpatrick - engineers
Tom Dowd, Doc Siegel - remixing
Les Weisbrich - art direction, illustration, graphics 
Jack Kern - photography

Charts
Album – Billboard (United States)

References

1972 albums
Black Oak Arkansas albums
Atco Records albums
Albums produced by Tom Dowd